Ibrahim Kallay (born 6 September 1993) is a Sierra Leonean international footballer who plays for Piteå IF as a midfielder.

Career
Kallay has played club football for FC Kallon, Umeå and Luleå.

He made his international debut for Sierra Leone in 2014.

References

1993 births
Living people
Sierra Leonean footballers
Sierra Leone international footballers
Association football midfielders
F.C. Kallon players
Umeå FC players
IFK Luleå players
Sierra Leonean expatriate footballers
Sierra Leonean expatriate sportspeople in Sweden
Expatriate footballers in Sweden